The USASA Elite Amateur Leagues are a group of amateur state and regional soccer leagues recognized by the United States Adult Soccer Association. They are considered to have a higher level of play than the other state league organizations recognized by the USASA.

National Affiliates 
 National Premier Soccer League (NPSL)
 USL League Two (USL2)
 United Premier Soccer League (UPSL)
 Women's Premier Soccer League (WPSL)

Multi-State Leagues
 Gulf Coast Premier League (GCPL)
 Eastern Development Program (EDP U23 and U20)
 United Women's Soccer
 West Coast Soccer Association (WCSA)

State Premier Leagues 
The Premier League Membership program is for the promotion of the top USASA leagues across the country. These leagues are part of the USASA structure as national leagues, regional leagues or members of a USASA State Association. There are currently 15 Elite USASA Leagues in the United States.

References

Soccer leagues in the United States